Jy may refer to:

Jansky (symbol Jy), non-SI unit of spectral electromagnetic flux density in radio astronomy
JY cell line, Epstein-Barr virus (EBV)-immortalised b cell lymphoblastoid line